Takao may refer to:

Geography
 Mount Takao, a mountain in Tokyo, Japan
 Mount Takao, a mountain in Kyoto, Japan, location of the Jingo-ji temple
 Takao, the Japanese name for Kaohsiung, a municipality in Taiwan
 Takao Prefecture, an administrative division of Taiwan during the Japanese rule

Ships

Other uses
 Takao (name), Japanese given name and surname (including a list of people with the name)
 Takao, the given name of the character Tyson Granger in the original Japanese version of the Beyblade manga series
 Takao (wrestler), is a Canadian professional wrestler

See also
 Takao Station (disambiguation)
 高雄 (disambiguation)